Toronto Shooting Stars were an indoor soccer team based in Toronto, Ontario that competed in the defunct NPSL.  The team began play in the 1996-1997 season, with home games taking place at Maple Leaf Gardens.  However, the ownership of the franchise collapsed just 3 games into its first season, forcing the league to take control of the team's operations for the remainder of the season.  After losses of nearly $1 million, the team suspended operations for the 1997-1998 season.  It was reported that the owner of the Toronto Maple Leafs held negotiations to purchase the team, but it never returned to play.

Year-by-year record

References

Association football clubs established in 1996
Association football clubs disestablished in 1997
Defunct soccer clubs in Canada
Sho
Defunct indoor soccer teams
National Professional Soccer League (1984–2001) teams
Canadian indoor soccer teams
1996 establishments in Ontario
1997 disestablishments in Ontario